Anastasia Griffith (born 23 March 1978) is a British actress known for her roles on the FX legal drama Damages and the NBC medical series Trauma. She has also acted in films and a video game.

Early life and education
Born in Paris, France, to a mother from Northern Ireland and a father from the United States, Griffith was brought up in west London with six older brothers, one of whom is actor Jamie Bamber.

She completed a degree in the History of Art at the University of Bristol and later trained at the London Academy of Music and Dramatic Art, before moving into acting.

Career

Griffith made her onscreen acting debut in a minor role, in the made-for-television movie She's Gone (2004). Also in 2004, she appeared in more prominent roles in the television movie Dirty Filthy Love, the comedy film Alfie, the short film Turn, and The Headsman. In 2005, she guest-starred in the British comedy The Worst Week of My Life.

Griffith won her role as Katie Connor, on the 2007 television series Damages, after taking a last-minute audition one month after moving to New York City. The role saw her with an imitated American accent; she says "[the producers] were a little concerned at first about a Brit playing an American, especially because they already had an Australian (Rose Byrne) playing an American," and so Griffith addressed them in an American accent from the beginning to the end of the audition. Griffith returned to the series as a main cast member for the second season, which aired in 2009.

She guest-starred in an episode of Law & Order: Special Victims Unit, and in the second episode of New Amsterdam, titled "Golden Boy". She was later cast in the NBC medical drama Trauma, which began airing in September 2009. In May 2010, after 18 episodes, NBC officially cancelled the show. Griffith returned on 17 June 2010, at the end from episode 3 season 2 from Royal Pains, as Dr. Emily Peck.

Griffith appeared in the Lifetime television movie And Baby Will Fall (2011), as Ivy Rose.

She can be seen as Elizabeth Haverford Morehouse, the English wife of a wealthy businessman, on the BBC America series Copper.In 2011, she appeared in the first season of ABC's television series,  Once Upon a Time'', playing Storybrooke's Kathryn Nolan and her counterpart Abigail.

Filmography

References

External links

British film actresses
British television actresses
Alumni of the University of Bristol
Alumni of the London Academy of Music and Dramatic Art
1978 births
Living people
British people of American descent
English people of Northern Ireland descent
Actresses from Paris
Actresses from London
21st-century British actresses
21st-century English women
21st-century English people